The 2016 Fairfield Challenger was a professional tennis tournament played on hard courts. It was the second edition of the tournament which was part of the 2016 ATP Challenger Tour. It took place in Fairfield, California, United States between 10 and 16 October 2016.

Singles main-draw entrants

Seeds

 1 Rankings are as of October 3, 2016.

Other entrants
The following players received wildcards into the singles main draw:
  Reilly Opelka
  Tom Fawcett
  Keegan Smith
  Brian Baker

The following players received entry using special exemptions:
  Michael Mmoh
  Mackenzie McDonald

The following players received entry from the qualifying draw:
  Brydan Klein
  Hans Podlipnik
  Dennis Nevolo
  Cameron Norrie

Champions

Singles

  Santiago Giraldo def.  Quentin Halys, 4–6, 6–4, 6–2.

Doubles

  Brian Baker /  Mackenzie McDonald def.  Sekou Bangoura /  Eric Quigley, 6–3, 6–4.

References

Fairfield Challenger
Fairfield Challenger